Vinodol is a Slavic toponym that may refer to:

Vinodol, Nitra, village and municipality in Slovakia
Vinodol, Croatia, municipality and valley in Croatia
Vinodol Channel, channel in Croatia
Vinodol Hydroelectric Power Plant, power plant in Croatia